William Farrington Aldrich (March 11, 1853 – October 30, 1925) was an American politician and a U.S. Representative from Alabama. He was brother of Truman Heminway Aldrich and great-great-grandfather of William J. Edwards.

Biography
Aldrich was born in Palmyra, New York on March 11, 1853, he was the son of William Farrington and Louisa Maria (Klapp) Aldrich. He attended public schools, and moved with his father to New York City in 1865, where he attended several schools and graduated from Warren's Military Academy in Poughkeepsie, New York, in 1873. Aldrich moved to Alabama in 1874. He leased the coal mines in Aldrich from his brother Truman, who was prospecting for new coal seams in the area. He was married on April 16, 1889, to writer and editor Josephine Cables, who died in 1917. He married Fannie Spire on July 15, 1920.

Career

Aldrich was elected as a Republican to the Fifty-fourth Congress, defeating Gaston A. Robbins; to attend the Fifty-fifth Congress, defeating Thomas S. Plowman; to attend the Fifty-sixth Congress, again defeating Robbins. He served from March 13, 1896, to March 3, 1901.

Declining to run for reelection in 1900, Aldrich was involved in mining and manufacturing and built up the town that bears his name. He was editor, owner and publisher of the Birmingham (Alabama) Times. He was a delegate to the Republican National Convention at Chicago in 1904. He engaged in the development of mineral lands until his death.

Death
Aldrich died in Birmingham, Alabama, October 30, 1925 (age 72 years, 233 days). He was cremated and his ashes are interred in the family vault located in Rock Creek Cemetery, Washington, D.C.

William F. Aldrich was the last Republican to represent Alabama in Congress until 1965.

References

Citations

Sources

External links

1853 births
1925 deaths
People from Palmyra, New York
Republican Party members of the United States House of Representatives from Alabama
Politicians from Birmingham, Alabama
Editors of Alabama newspapers
Burials at Rock Creek Cemetery